Warawarani (Aymara warawara star, -ni a suffix to indicate ownership, "the one with a star", also spelled Wara Warani) is an about  mountain at a small lake of the same name in the Cordillera Real in the Andes of Bolivia. It is located in the La Paz Department, Los Andes Province, Batallas Municipality, Chachacomani Canton. It is situated north and northwest of Phaq'u Kiwuta and Wila Lluxi and northeast of Qala T'uxu.

Warawarani lake 


Warawarani Lake lies southwest of the Warawarani mountain.

See also
 Chachakumani
 Janq'u Uyu
 Kunturiri
 Q'ara Quta

References 

Mountains of La Paz Department (Bolivia)
Lakes of La Paz Department (Bolivia)